The Indonesia Higher Education Network was an inter-university educational network in Indonesia.  For the first phase of development, the network consists of 32 universities. The main ring of this network is located on the island of Java, five universities as a backbone network connected using STM-1 line with a total 155 Mbit/s of bandwidth capacity. Those universities are the University of Indonesia, the Bandung Institute of Technology, the Sepuluh Nopember Institute of Technology, Gadjah Mada University and the Diponegoro University. It was active since 2006.

Since 2013, INHERENT is no longer active. The INHERENT Network was eventually replaced by Indonesia Research and Education Network (IDREN) in 2015.

References

Education in Indonesia
Internet in Indonesia
National research and education networks